Adolphus Gustavus Bauer (1858–1898) was an architect in North Carolina. He worked with the more famous architect Samuel Sloan and helped him build the Executive Mansion in Raleigh.

Life

Bauer struggled to find business after the death of his partner Samuel Sloan and left Raleigh for some time. When he returned he did find work on some of his better-known buildings. While he was working on the Pullen Building  in 1884, he met his wife-to-be, Cherokee Indian Rachel Blythe. The couple had to leave North Carolina to get married, since interracial marriages were illegal in North Carolina at the time.

A few years later, in 1896, Bauer's carriage was struck by a train. He survived, but the trauma gave him continuing psychological issues which ruined his reputation. After Rachel died in 1897, his mental health grew even worse. He constructed an elaborate tombstone for her based on a Grecian temple. Shortly after completing this last project, Bauer committed suicide by shooting himself in the head.

Works (not a comprehensive list)

Church of the Saviour and Cemetery, jct. of Church and Calhoun Sts. Jackson, North Carolina (Bauer, Adolphus Gustavus), NRHP-listed
The Academy of Music
North Carolina Executive Mansion, 210 N. Blount St. Raleigh, NC (Bauer, Gustavus Adolphus), NRHP-listed
The Pullen Building
Baptist Female University
North Carolina School for the Deaf: Main Building, U.S. 64 and Fleming Dr. Morganton, North Carolina (Bauer, Adolphus Gustavus), NRHP-listed
NC Department of Labor Building 
First Presbyterian Church (Raleigh, North Carolina)

Further reading

Bushong, William B. “A. G. Bauer, North Carolina's New South Architect.” North Carolina Historical Review v.60, no. 3 (July 1983): 304–32.
Prioli, Carmine A. “The Indian 'Princess' and the architect : origin of a North Carolina legend.” North Carolina Historical Review v.60, no. 3 (July 1983): 283–303.

References

Architects from North Carolina
Suicides by firearm in North Carolina
1858 births
1898 deaths
19th-century American architects
1890s suicides
People with mental disorders